Béat Louis de Muralt (Bern, 9 January 1665 - Colombier NE 20 November 1749) was a Swiss author and travel writer.

Works
Lettres sur les Anglais et les Français (1725).
Lettres sur les Anglois et les François, ed. Charles Gould (Paris: H. Champion, 1933).
L’instinct divin recommandé aux hommes (1727).
Lettres sur les voyages et sur l’esprit-fort (1728).
Lettres fanatiques (1739).
Fables nouvelles (1753, posthume).

External link
 Portrait of Béat Louis de Muralt by Charles Le Brun 1690
 Book texts of Béat Louis de Muralt

Notes

1665 births
1749 deaths
Swiss travel writers
18th-century travel writers
Béat Louis